Silvia Zarza Bris (born 30 April 1977) is a Spanish padel player and former football player. As a footballer she played as an offensive midfielder.

Through the 1990s she played for Madrilene teams Parque Alcobendas CF, ADFF Butarque and CF Pozuelo. In 2001, she signed for national champion Levante UD, with which she won a Spanish championship and a national cup and played the newly founded UEFA Women's Cup, and two years later she returned to Madrid to play for ADCF Torrejón, where she ended her career in 2009.

She earned 36 caps for the Spain women's national football team, taking part in the 1997 European Championship.

References

1977 births
Living people
Spanish women's footballers
Footballers from Madrid
Primera División (women) players
Levante UD Femenino players
Women's association football midfielders
CF Pozuelo de Alarcón Femenino players
AD Torrejón CF Femenino players